The 2011 Blu-express.com Tennis Cup was a professional tennis tournament played on clay courts. It was the fifth edition of the tournament which was part of the 2011 ATP Challenger Tour. It took place in Todi, Italy between 12 and 18 September 2011.

Singles main draw entrants

Seeds

 1 Rankings are as of August 29, 2011.

Other entrants
The following players received wildcards into the singles main draw:
  Thomas Fabbiano
  Daniele Giorgini
  Thomas Muster
  Filippo Volandri

The following players received entry from the qualifying draw:
  Enrico Burzi
  Antonio Comporto
  Yann Marti
  Luca Vanni

Champions

Singles

 Carlos Berlocq def.  Filippo Volandri, 6–3, 6–1

Doubles

 Stefano Ianni /  Luca Vanni def.  Martin Fischer /  Alessandro Motti, 6–4, 1–6, [11–9]

External links
Official website
ITF Search
ATP official site

Blu-express.com Tennis Cup
Clay court tennis tournaments
Internazionali di Tennis Città dell'Aquila
2011 in Italian tennis